Mohcine Hassan Nader (born 30 September 1994) is a Portuguese professional footballer who plays as a forward for F.C. Alverca.

Club career
Born in Faro, Algarve, where his Moroccan international father Hassan Nader played in the same position for S.C. Farense, Nader finished his development at Vitória F.C. and spent his first two years as a senior in third division, on loan at Casa Pia A.C. and C.D. Pinhalnovense. He made his professional debut in the Primeira Liga for the Setúbal-based club on 25 October 2015, coming on as a late substitute for André Claro in a 2–0 away win against Moreirense FC, and totalled 13 appearances over the season; on his first start, the following 22 January, he scored the opening goal of a 2–1 home victory over Académica de Coimbra.

Days after his first goal, Setúbal enacted the extension clause in Nader's contract, tying him to the club until June 2018. In August 2016, he was loaned to LigaPro team S.C. Freamunde for the upcoming campaign. The following year, he joined Campeonato de Portugal side S.C. Olhanense also on loan; the move was made permanent in the summer of 2018.

On 4 August 2022, after two years at F91 Dudelange in the Luxembourg National Division, Nader returned to the Portuguese third tier at F.C. Alverca in Liga 3.

References

External links

Portuguese League profile 

1994 births
Living people
People from Faro, Portugal
Portuguese people of Moroccan descent
Portuguese sportspeople of African descent
Sportspeople of Moroccan descent
Sportspeople from Faro District
Portuguese footballers
Moroccan footballers
Association football forwards
Primeira Liga players
Liga Portugal 2 players
Segunda Divisão players
Vitória F.C. players
Casa Pia A.C. players
C.D. Pinhalnovense players
S.C. Freamunde players
S.C. Olhanense players
F.C. Alverca players
Luxembourg National Division players
F91 Dudelange players
Portuguese expatriate footballers
Expatriate footballers in Luxembourg
Portuguese expatriate sportspeople in Luxembourg